Lavdrim Rexhepi (born 12 February 1998) is a Swiss footballer who plays as a midfielder for FC Zürich in the Swiss Super League.

Professional career
Rexhepi made his professional debut for FCZ in a 1–1 Swiss Super League tie with FC Luzern on 18 February 2018.

On 23 November 2018, Rexhepi was loaned out to FC Rapperswil-Jona until the end of 2018. The loan was later extended for the rest of the season. This was confirmed on 8 January 2019.

Personal life
Rexhepi was born in Switzerland and is of Kosovan–Albanian descent.

References

External links
 Soccerway Profile
 UEFA PRrofile

 SFL Profile

1998 births
Living people
Footballers from Zürich
Association football midfielders
Swiss men's footballers
Swiss people of Albanian descent
Swiss people of Kosovan descent
Swiss Super League players
FC Zürich players
FC Rapperswil-Jona players